The Scout Alliance is a political alliance in Benin led by Edmond Agoua.

History
The alliance was launched on 20 February 2015. It included the Party for Democracy and Social Progress, the Renewal Party for Solidarity and Progress,  the Coalition for an Emerging Benin, the Common Action Front for the Emergence of a New Ethic in Benin, the New Alliance for Development, the Party for the Impulse of Development and Active Solidarity, the Movement for Social Democracy, the Party of Collective Awakening for a Better Tomorrow, the Wadedji Democratic Party, the Liberal Reformer Party, Generation-Action-Progress, the Young Turks, the Movement for Solidarity and Durable Development and the Youth Movement for the Emergence of Couffo.

The alliance won two seats in the 2015 parliamentary elections.

References

Political party alliances in Benin
2015 establishments in Benin
Political parties established in 2015